Hôtel Le Bristol is a five-star hotel located in Paris, France, at 112 rue du Faubourg Saint Honoré. Hôtel Le Bristol opened in 1925 and is famous for its historic architecture. The hotel is part of the Oetker Collection, Masterpiece Hotels, which is owned the Oetkers family and was founded by Rudolf August Oetker.

History 
Located on rue du Faubourg Saint-Honoré, the Bristol emerged as one of the top Paris hotels by 1877, when ex-president Ulysses S. Grant and his entourage stayed there for five weeks during his post-presidency world tour.

In 1923, Hippolyte Jammet purchased the property of Julles de Castellane on the Faubourg. Jammet’s mission was to transform this mansion into one of the most luxurious hotels. The name Hôtel Le Bristol, which had been familiar in Place Vendôme from the mid-19th century until World War I, derives originally from the Bishop Frederick Augustus Hervey, 4th Earl of Bristol, known for his high demand for luxury when he travelled on the Continent during the 18th century. Hotel le Bristol opened in 1925.

During the Second World War, beginning in June 1940, Hôtel Le Bristol would become the home of the American embassy and American nationals living in Paris during the War. Hippolyte Jammet succeeded in keeping his hotel and during the war worked to maintain its prestige, carrying out renovation projects as well as maintenance.

Following the opening of Pierre Cardin’s boutique at 118 Rue du Faubourg St. Honoré in 1954, many other luxury brands began to open boutiques. With the opening of boutiques such as Lanvin and Christian Lacroix, the hotel was frequented by clients such as Charlie Chaplin, Rita Hayworth and other celebrities. Starting in the 1960s and onwards from there, Hotel Le Bristol became a destination for fashion photographers. In 1962, the hotel was ranked number one by the American travel guide Fielding’s, thus cementing its reputation in America as one of the top hotels. In 1968 the hotel was taken over by Hippolyte’s son Pierre, who postponed some restoration work due to riots in May 1968.

During the 1970s, Hôtel Le Bristol underwent major expansions and renovations. In 1978, it was acquired by Rudolf August Oetker, founder of the German industrial group Oetker, and an owner of other hotels on the French Rivera. Oetker began extension work in the 1980s, which included expansion of the hotel’s rooms, restoration of the garden and a 6th floor swimming pool with views of the Parisian skyline.

In 1994, Pierre Ferchaud was appointed the manager of the Hotel. He would later become the managing director. During his time managing the hotel, Ferchaud converted some of the guestrooms into luxury suites. In 2004, the hotel underwent a huge restoration and renovation. 2004 also saw the creation of Hotel Le Bristol’s “fashion high teas”. In 2005 the Bar of Le Bristol was refurbished.

In 2007 Le Bristol acquired the building next door; this purchase allowed the hotel to become more prominent on the corner of avenue Matignon and rue du Faubourg Saint-Honoré. This also allowed for the hotel to show sculptural exhibits.

In 2009, the Matignon Residence, Hôtel Le Bristol’s renovation of the next door building, was unveiled with an additional twenty-one rooms and five suites, as well as a new restaurant, 114 Faubourg.

In 2010, the Hôtel Le Bristol recruited a new manager, Didier Le Calvez. From 2010 until 2016, the hotel completed a six-year, $190 million renovation. It was fitted with two new honeymoon suites, offering views of Paris. The Restaurant was renovated in a French style, while still serving up the same food. A children’s play area and hair salon have also been added.

Characteristics 
The Hôtel Le Bristol contains 188 rooms. The amenities include a La Prairie Spa, a pool viewing the Sacré-Cœur, Paris and a fitness centre.

In 2018, the hotel partnered with Opera Gallery to exhibit work by Manolo Valdés; and shown sculpture by Ugo Rondinone and a site-specific work by Daniel Buren, both in association with Galerie Kamel Mennour.

Architecture 
The building has a large limestone facade and a glass-and-wrought-iron elevator. The swimming pool resembles the front of a large sailboat; it is notable for being designed by architect Pinnau, who also designed the yachts of the Onassis and Niarchos family. The architecture and decor reflects 18th-century history of when the hotel was originally built. Hôtel Le Bristol has recently invested over $30 million in renovations, refurbishing, amenities and rooms. The signature decor is the toile de Jouy, which includes classic patterned furnishings and floral motifs.

Popular culture 
The Hotel Le Bristol featured in Woody Allen's film Midnight in Paris (2011). The hotel is also mentioned in Outcasts: A Seal Team Six Novel by Stephen Templin and Howard E. Wasdin.

See also 
 The Leading Hotels of the World

References 

Hotel buildings completed in 1925
Hotels in Paris
Hotel Le Bristol Paris
Hotels established in 1925
Hotel Le Bristol Paris
Oetker Collection